The 2003 Nasiriyah bombing was a suicide attack on the Italian Carabinieri MSU headquarters in Nasiriyah, Iraq, south of Baghdad on 12 November 2003. The attack resulted in the deaths of 18 Italian servicemembers, mostly members of the MSU Carabinieri, an Italian civilian, and 9 Iraqi civilians and was the worst Italian military disaster since the Second World War. The attack, labeled a "terrorist act" by Italian president Carlo Azeglio Ciampi, was among a string of many  attacks on non-American military international targets in Iraq that occurred shortly after the end of major combat operations, including the Jordanian and Turkish embassies, International Red Cross, and UN facilities.

Prelude
Before the 2003 U.S.-led invasion of Iraq, the future Carabinieri and Portuguese Guarda Nacional Republicana headquarters was the Nasiriyah Chamber of Commerce, a three-story structure near the Euphrates River.  The first U.S. forces to occupy the building were Marines from the 15th Marine Expeditionary Unit, who were later relieved by reservists from the 2nd Battalion 25th Marines.

Italy took part in the Iraq War, as part of the Multi-National Force – Iraq, from 15 July 2003 until 1 December 2006, in and around Nasiriyah (see Operation Ancient Babylon).
On July 19, 2003 the Marines in Nasiriyah were replaced by members of the Carabinieri and Italian army. Italian forces in Iraq were under British command and those in Nasiriyah were some of about 3,000 total Italian servicemembers in the country, including 400 Carabinieri forces of the Multinational Specialized Unit.

Attack
The attack began shortly before 11:00 a.m. when a large tanker truck sped towards the entrance of the base. Carabiniere Andrea Filippa, who was part of the unit guarding the main gate and was among the casualties, managed to shoot and kill the two drivers before the vehicle could smash through the gate and enter the compound. The tanker slammed onto the gate, stopped and exploded in a massive fireball. Nearby houses sustained structural damage and a car carrying five Iraqi women was incinerated, killing those inside. The blast was so powerful that buildings across the Euphrates river suffered shattered windows. The front of the three-story building serving as the Italian headquarters collapsed. 18 Italian troops, including 12 Carabinieri policemen were killed in the blast along with an Italian civilian. A further 20 Italians and 80 Iraqis were wounded.

Aftermath
The attack was the worst incident involving Italian soldiers since Operation Restore Hope in Somalia and the highest loss of Italian soldiers since World War II. The attack thus shocked Italy and plunged it into a three-day mourning period. The soldiers were given a state funeral. Despite the large loss, Italian Prime Minister Silvio Berlusconi reaffirmed his commitment to the mission in Iraq and President George W. Bush said in a statement at the White House, "Today in Iraq, a member of NATO, Italy, lost some proud sons in the service of freedom and peace."

Italian Defence Minister Antonio Martino pinned blame on Saddam Hussein loyalists saying, "evidence on the ground and intelligence reports lead us to believe that today's attack was planned and carried out by remnants loyal to Saddam... united with Arab extremists."

Film
Nassiryia - Per non dimenticare
20 Cigarettes

References

External links
Attack on Italian police kills 26 in Iraq

See also
Operation Ancient Babylon
2017 Nasiriyah attacks
Multinational Specialized Unit

2003 murders in Iraq
21st-century mass murder in Iraq
Mass murder in 2003
Military history of Italy
Suicide car and truck bombings in Iraq
Terrorist incidents in Iraq in 2003
November 2003 events in Asia